Surreal World is a leading boutique Australian visual effects and animation studio based in Melbourne, Australia. It was founded in 1995 as the creative studio of Melbourne artist, composer, animator, and filmmaker, John Francis. From beginnings creating the award-winning short films such as the animated canine in Tug Wilson (1996) and the cycling elephants in Baby Elephants Day Out (1998), work for clients followed with music clips, visual effects and animation for TV commercials, TV series and feature films.

Surreal World operates a visual effects and animation services facility for the film, television, advertising, and corporate industries, and an entertainment production studio, developing a slate of entertainment projects. Surreal World creates visual effects and animation for major Australian TV and theatrically released feature films such as The Cup (2011), Paper Planes (2014) and Oddball (2015). Surreal World also creates visual effects for many of Australia's TV series including the multi-award-winning Nowhere Boys (2013 - 2018), the TV mini series Barracuda (2016), and the TV shows Wentworth (2013 - 2018), and A Place To Call Home (2015 - 2018). The studio recently completed extensive visual effects for the feature films High Ground, and the top Australian box office movie for 2019, Ride Like a Girl.

Selected credits
Between Two Worlds (2019)
High Ground (2019)
I Met A Girl (2019)
Ride Like A Girl (2019)
The Dust Walker (2019)
The Longest Shot (2019)
At Last (2019)
Wentworth - Series 7 (2018)
A Place To Call Home - Series 6 (2018)
Nowhere Boys - Series 4 (2018)
Homecoming Queens (2018)
Wentworth - Series 6 (2017)
A Place To Call Home - Series 5 (2017)
Home And Away (2017)
Nowhere Boys - Series 3 (2017)
Home And Away (2016)
A Place To Call Home - Series 4 (2016)
Barracuda (2016)
Wentworth - Series 4 (2016)
Nowhere Boys Movie - The Book Of Shadows (2016)
Home And Away (2015)
A Place To Call Home - Series 3 (2015)
Oddball (2015)
Nowhere Boys - Series 2 (2015)
Winter - TV Series (2014)
Paper Planes (2014)
Wentworth - Series 3 (2014)
The Killing Field - Mini Series (2014)
Maximum Choppage (2014)
The Menkoff Method (2014)
Wentworth - Series 2 (2014)
The Worst Year Of My Life Again (2014)
Nowhere Boys - Series 1(2013)The Turning (2013)Fatal Honeymoon (2012)Gallipoli From Above (2012)Kath and Kimderella (2012)The Cup'' (2011)

External links

Visual effects companies
Mass media companies established in 1995
Companies based in Melbourne